Robert Alan Mitchell (born 5 August 1948) is a former Australian politician. He was the National Party member for Charters Towers in the Legislative Assembly of Queensland from 1992 to 2001.

Biography

Mitchell was born in Aramac, Queensland. He served on Flinders Shire Council from 1977 to 1982. He was appointed to the Coalition front bench in 1998 as Shadow Minister for Mines and Energy, but he left the ministry in 1999. He was defeated in 2001.

References

1948 births
Living people
National Party of Australia members of the Parliament of Queensland
Members of the Queensland Legislative Assembly
21st-century Australian politicians